Kaleo (stylized as KALEO) is an Icelandic blues rock band which formed in Mosfellsbær in 2012. It consists of lead vocalist and guitarist Jökull Júlíusson, drummer David Antonsson, bassist Daniel Kristjansson, lead guitarist Rubin Pollock and harmonicist Þorleifur Gaukur Davíðsson. They have released three studio albums, Kaleo (2013), A/B (2016) and Surface Sounds (2021) as well as an EP, Glasshouse (2013). A/B has sold over one million albums worldwide. One of the singles from A/B, "Way Down We Go", was certified double platinum in the US and reached number one on the Billboard Alternative Songs chart on 20 August 2016. Kaleo received a Grammy nomination in 2017 for Best Rock Performance for the song "No Good".

Surface Sounds, their third studio album, was released on 23 April 2021.

History

2012–2013: Early years and self-titled album 
Best friends since attending elementary school outside of Reykjavik, band leader JJ, drummer David Antonsson, and bassist Daniel Kristjansson began playing together at the age of 17 before adding guitarist Rubin Pollock to the mix in 2012. They named the band Kaleo, which means "the voice" in Hawaiian, and started their career with a handful of well-received shows at the 2012 Iceland Airwaves music festival, which was the band's first major public appearance.
Kaleo gained fame after covering the song "Vor í Vaglaskógi" which received heavy rotation on Icelandic state broadcaster RÚV's radio station Rás 2 and was featured on the station's top 10 list. This song is also featured in the first episode of the TV series Trapped. By year's end, Kaleo had signed with Sena, the country's main record label. Their self-titled debut went gold in their home country, spawning five number-one hits and inspiring their first European tour.

2013–2019: major label record deal, departure to America, A/B and touring 

In 2014, the band gained further attention with their single "All the Pretty Girls", which garnered over 87 million streams on Spotify. In early 2015, they signed with Atlantic Records and subsequently relocated to Austin, Texas. Throughout 2015, Kaleo received increasing attention in the United States. The band's South by Southwest (SXSW) debut in 2015 garnered press from Esquires "40 Bands You Need to Hear" as well as NPR's "The Austin 100: SXSW 2015" feature and All Songs Considereds "SXSW 2015 Music Preview". "All the Pretty Girls" peaked at number 9 on Billboard'''s Adult Alternative Songs chart.

Another three singles were released to promote their upcoming major label debut album A/B: "Way Down We Go", "No Good", and "I Can't Go On Without You". The single "Way Down We Go", was released in August 2015 and gained critical acclaim. The single was certified gold in the United Kingdom, Belgium, Ireland, South Africa and Germany, Platinum in Russia, Australia and the United States, and triple platinum in Canada. The single "No Good" was released shortly after and was featured in the promo for HBO's Vinyl. The fourth single, "I Can't Go On Without You", was released on 18 February 2016. The album was released worldwide later that year on 10 June 2016.

The album peaked at number 16 on the Billboard 200, and the band embarked on a tour, the Handprint Tour, in order to promote it. The tour began on 11 September 2016 and concluded on 30 November 2016. The band embarked on a second tour, the fall Express Tour, which started on 25 August 2017 in Anaheim, California, and ended on 25 November in Moscow, Russia.

 2020–present: Surface Sounds 
On 15 January 2020, KALEO released two singles, "I Want More" and "Break My Baby", the first music released since A/B. They followed this up with the announcement of the album's title and track list on 13 March, with the album scheduled for 5 June, along with dates for the Fight or Flight Tour, to take place July–September 2020. The third single "Alter Ego" was also released on 13 March, with JJ describing it as "the most classic rock and roll song". The fourth single "Backbone" was released on 17 April, although on 27 May, they delayed the album's release until further notice due to the COVID-19 pandemic. They were also forced to postpone their Fight or Flight tour twice, first to April–July 2021, and then to February–May 2022.

On 5 February 2021, they released a live version of "Break My Baby", recorded from Þrídrangar Lighthouse on 5 July 2020, the 78th anniversary of the lighthouse. Fifth single "Skinny" was released on 1 April 2021, with the announcement of the album's new release date of 23 April.

 Musical style 
Kaleo's music has been influenced by genres such as blues rock, indie folk and alternative rock. In an interview with Rolling Stone, frontman JJ explained, "Growing up I was listening to a lot of American music and blues artists and such and that was what kind of connected us." Their blues influences are mainly drawn from Delta blues which was the target for some of the heavier songs in their album A/B. Their music prominently features a distinctive resonator sound.

Lead singer JJ has given influences such as Jimi Hendrix, Carlos Santana and Jim Morrison, while critics liken their music to that of Hozier, Ray LaMontagne, Led Zeppelin, Cream and ZZ Top.

 Media appearances 
The group has made multiple appearances on late night television shows including Conan, Jimmy Kimmel Live! Late Night with Seth Meyers and The Late Show With Stephen Colbert.

Their single "Way Down We Go" has been featured in many TV shows including Blindspot, The Blacklist, Lucifer, Supergirl, Grey's Anatomy, The Vampire Diaries, Riverdale, Training Day, Suits, Teen Wolf, The Night Shift and Underground, as well as trailers/promos for The Good Fight, Quantico, Orange Is the New Black, Empire, The Leftovers and Logan, among others.
Kaleo's 'I can't go on without you' was used on the Sky Italy produced Petra TV detective series (Series 1, Episode 4 - 2020).

Several Kaleo songs including "Way Down We Go", "Hot Blood", "No Good", "All the Pretty Girls" and "Glass House" have been featured in FIFA 16, Madden NFL 17, NHL 18, Far Cry 5, The Crew 2, Rocksmith 2014 and Asphalt 9: Legends. Their song "Automobile" was used in Collateral Beauty and "Break my Baby" features in the video game MLB The Show 20''.

Members 
The band is made up of:
 Jökull Júlíusson (short: JJ) – lead vocals, rhythm guitar, piano
 Rubin Pollock – lead guitar
 Daníel Ægir Kristjánsson – bass, keyboard
 Davíð Antonsson – drums, percussion, backing vocals
 Þorleifur Gaukur Davíðsson – harmonica, bongos, keyboard

Discography

Albums

Singles

Other charted and certified songs

Music videos

Awards 
"No Good" received a Grammy nomination for Best Rock Performance.

Tours 
 Opened for Vance Joy in late 2015.
 SXSW 2015 – Debut included performances at Pandora's Discovery Den, KGSR, Neiman Marcus Make Some Noise, and more.
 2016 – Byron Bay Bluesfest
 2016 – "Way Down We Go" Tour ft. "Dizzy" Daniel Moorehead
 2016–2017 – Kaleo Handprint Tour
 2017 – Opened for The Lumineers Cleopatra Tour
 2017.09.09 – Opened for The Rolling Stones (in Hamburg)
 2017 – Kaleo Express Tour
 2022 – Fight or Flight Tour

Notes

References 

Icelandic indie rock groups
English-language singers from Iceland